Edward Edmund Burton (1737-1817) was an Anglican priest  in Ireland during the late 18th and early 19th centuries.
 
Burton was born in County Galway and educated at Trinity College, Dublin. He was appointed Prebendary of Kilmeen then Faldown at Tuam Cathedral in 1768. in 1771 he became  Archdeacon of Tuam and Vicar general of the diocese. from 1795 until 1796; and Dean of Killala from then until his death in 1817.

Notes

Alumni of Trinity College Dublin
18th-century Irish Anglican priests
19th-century Irish Anglican priests
Deans of Killala
Archdeacons of Tuam
1817 deaths
1737 births